Charles Mitchel is the name of:
Charles Mitchel (1920–1996), Irish actor and television newsreader
Charles B. Mitchel (1815–1864), Democratic Party politician from Arkansas

See also
Charles Mitchell (disambiguation)